Owen Sound Transit provides local bus service and specialized transit for the city of Owen Sound, Ontario, which is located at the southwest end of Georgian Bay.

Both of those services operate out of the downtown transit terminal. Regular bus service consists of a four route system with daytime operations from Monday through Saturday. All four routes provide a half-hourly service on Monday to Friday between 6:30 am and 6:00 pm, with a less frequent Saturday service between 9:00 am and 5:30 pm.

Owen Sound Transit Terminal

Location: 1020 3rd Avenue East, Owen Sound
Coordinates:

Old Bus Terminal Building
Location: 1023 2nd Avenue East, Owen Sound
Coordinates: 
History: Constructed in 1945, and designated under the Ontario Heritage Act, this building is an example of Art Moderne. Although no longer a functioning terminal, the style reflects the era of streamlining appropriate for a bus station.

Bus routes
 East Bay Shore serves the northeast portion of town, including the hospital.
 Core Route is the central east–west route across 10th Street, including the hospital.
 Crosstown serves the southern part of town.
 Brooke serves the northwestern part of town.

Intercity service
 Grey Owen Sound Transit to Guelph.
 Aboutown Transportation had formerly provided scheduled bus service to London Greyhound Canada previously served Toronto.

See also

 Public transport in Canada

References 

Transit agencies in Ontario
Transport in Owen Sound